Kameron Cline (born February 19, 1998) is an American football defensive end for the Indianapolis Colts of the National Football League (NFL). He was signed by the Colts as an undrafted free agent in 2020 following his college football career with the South Dakota Coyotes.

Professional career
Cline signed with the Indianapolis Colts as an undrafted free agent following the 2020 NFL Draft on April 29, 2020. He was waived during final roster cuts on September 5, 2020, and signed to the team's practice squad the next day. He was elevated to the active roster on November 28 for the team's week 12 game against the Tennessee Titans where he recorded his first career tackle in the NFL and reverted to the practice squad after the game. On January 10, 2021, Cline signed a reserve/futures contract with the Colts.

On August 31, 2021, Cline was waived by the Colts and re-signed to the practice squad the next day. He signed a reserve/future contract on January 10, 2022.

On August 30, 2022, Cline was waived by the Colts and signed to the practice squad the next day. He was promoted to the active roster on December 31.

References

External links
Indianapolis Colts bio
South Dakota Coyotes football bio

1998 births
Living people
Players of American football from San Diego
American football defensive tackles
South Dakota Coyotes football players
Indianapolis Colts players